Philip Perlman (August 15, 1919 – April 29, 2015) was a Polish-born American businessman, film and television actor.

Career 
Perlman became an actor after retiring from a career in the toy business. He is known for his recurring role as "Phil" on the American sitcom television series Cheers, on which his daughter, Rhea, starred. He  appeared in 142 episodes. He also played the same character in one episode of spin-off series Frasier.

Perlman also had roles in several films, including Throw Momma from the Train (1987), Out of Sight (1998), and Man on the Moon (1999), in most of which his son-in-law, Danny DeVito, appeared.

Personal life 
Perlman was born in Poland in 1919. He married his wife, Adele (1921-2017), in 1947 and they had two daughters, actress Rhea Perlman and script writer Heide Perlman. Perlman died in April 2015 at Los Angeles, California, at the age of 95.

Filmography

Film

Television

References

External links 

1919 births
2015 deaths
20th-century American male actors
American male film actors
American male television actors
American people of Polish-Jewish descent
Jewish American male actors
Polish emigrants to the United States